Verkhny Tashbukan (Ürge Taşbükän) is a rural locality (a village) in Tashbukanovsky Selsoviet, Gafuriysky District, Bashkortostan, Russia. The population was 55 as of 2010. There are 2 streets.

Geography 
Verkhny Tashbukan is located 23 km southeast of Krasnousolsky (the district's administrative centre) by road. Nizhny Tashbukan is the nearest rural locality.

References 

Rural localities in Gafuriysky District